A cello sonata is usually a sonata written for solo cello with piano accompaniment. The most famous Romantic-era cello sonatas are those written by Johannes Brahms and Ludwig van Beethoven. Some of the earliest cello sonatas were written in the 18th century by Francesco Geminiani and Antonio Vivaldi.

The following list contains cello sonatas with or without accompanying instruments. See the See also list for more comprehensive lists divided up into solo and accompanied works.

List of major cello sonatas

Charles-Valentin Alkan
Sonate de Concert, Op. 47 (c. 1857)
Samuel Barber
Cello Sonata in C minor, Op. 6 (1932)
Arnold Bax
Cello Sonata (1923)
Cello Sonatina (1933)
Legend-Sonata (1943)
Ludwig van Beethoven
Cello Sonata No. 1 in F major, Op. 5/1 (1796)
Cello Sonata No. 2 in G minor, Op. 5/2 (1796)
Cello Sonata No. 3 in A major, Op. 69 (1808)
Cello Sonata No. 4 in C major, Op. 102/1 (1815)
Cello Sonata No. 5 in D major, Op. 102/2 (1815)
Easley Blackwood Jr.
Cello Sonata, Op. 31
Johannes Brahms
Cello Sonata No. 1 in E minor, Op. 38 (1862–5)
Cello Sonata No. 2 in F major, Op. 99 (1886)
Violin Sonata No. 1, "Rain", Op. 78 (1878–9), transcribed for cello
Frank Bridge
Cello sonata in D minor, H. (Hindmarsh) 125 (1913-7)
Benjamin Britten
Sonata in C for Cello and Piano, Op. 65 (1961)
Elliott Carter
Cello Sonata (1948)
Frédéric Chopin
Cello Sonata in G minor, Op. 65 (1845–6)
George Crumb
Sonata for Solo Cello (1955)
Claude Debussy
Cello Sonata in D minor (1915)
Frederick Delius
Cello Sonata (1916)
Felix Draeseke
Cello Sonata in D major, Op. 51 (1890)
Antonín Dvořák
Cello Sonata in F major (1871) lost (cello part extant)
George Enescu
Cello Sonata in F minor, Op. 26/1 (1898)
Cello sonata in C major, Op. 26/2 (1935)
Gabriel Fauré
Cello Sonata No. 1 in D minor, Op. 109 (1917)
Cello Sonata No. 2 in G minor, Op. 117 (1921)
César Franck
 Violin Sonata in A major, transcribed with the composer's approval for cello by Jules Delsart. See 
John Foulds
 Cello Sonata (1905, rev. 1927)
François Francoeur (attrib.)
Sonata for Cello and Piano in E major (actually a cello arrangement of a Louis Francoeur violin sonata)
Peter Racine Fricker
Cello Sonata (1956)
Zoltán Gárdonyi
Cello Sonata (1944)
Edvard Grieg
Cello Sonata in A minor, Op. 36 (1883)
Paul Hindemith
Cello Sonata, Op. 11/3 (1919)
Sonata for Cello Solo, Op. 25/3 (1923)  
Cello Sonata (1948) 
Vagn Holmboe
Sonata for Solo Cello, Op. 101 (1968–69)
Arthur Honegger
Cello Sonata in D minor, H.32 (1920)
Stephen Hough
Sonata for Cello and Piano (left hand) (2014)
Bertold Hummel
Cello Sonata in F major, Op. 2 (1950)
Sonata brevis, Op. 11a (1955)
Johann Nepomuk Hummel
Sonata in A major, Op. 104

John Ireland
Cello Sonata in G minor (1923)
Giuseppe Maria Jacchini
 Sonata No. 3 in C major (1697)
Joseph Jongen
 Cello Sonata in C minor, Op. 39 (1913)
Dmitry Kabalevsky
Cello Sonata in B flat major, Op. 71 (1962)
Zoltán Kodály
Cello Sonata, Op. 4 (1907)
Sonata for Solo Cello, Op. 8 (1915)
Cello Sonatine (1923)
Josef Labor
Cello Sonata Sonata in A major, Op. 7 (1896)
Édouard Lalo 
Cello Sonata in A minor (1856)
Lowell Liebermann
Cello Sonata No. 1, Op. 3 (1978)
Cello Sonata No. 2, Op. 61 (1998)
Cello Sonata No. 3, Op. 90 (2005)
Cello Sonata No. 4, Op. 108 (2008)
György Ligeti
Sonata for Solo Cello
Albéric Magnard
Sonata for Cello in A, Op. 20 (1910)
Felix Mendelssohn
Cello Sonata No. 1 in B-flat major, Op. 45 (1838)
Cello Sonata No. 2 in D major, Op. 58 (1842–3)
Ignaz Moscheles
Cello Sonata Op. 34 in B-flat major
Cello Sonata No. 2 Op. 121 in E major
Henrique Oswald
Cello Sonata No. 1 in D minor, Op. 21 (1898)
Cello Sonata No. 2 in E-flat major, Op. 44 (1916)
Hubert Parry
Cello Sonata in A major (1879–83)
Giovanni Battista Pergolesi
Cello Sonata in F major (uncertain attribution)
Francis Poulenc
Cello Sonata, FP 143 (1948)
Sergei Prokofiev
Cello Sonata in C major, Op. 119 (1949)
Sonata for Solo Cello in C minor, Op. 134 (unfinished)
Sergei Rachmaninoff
Cello Sonata in G minor, Op. 19 (1901)
Maurice Ravel
Sonata for Violin and Cello (1920–22) 
Max Reger
Cello Sonata No. 1 in F minor, Op. 5 (1892)
Cello Sonata No. 2 in G minor, Op. 28 (1898)
Cello Sonata No. 3 in F major, Op. 78 (1904)
Cello Sonata No. 4 in A minor, Op. 116 (1910)
Edmund Rubbra
Cello Sonata in G minor, Op. 60 (1946)
Camille Saint-Saëns
Cello Sonata No. 1 in C minor, Op. 32  
Cello Sonata No. 2 in F major, Op. 123 
Philipp Scharwenka
Cello Sonata in G minor, Op. 116
Alfred Schnittke
Cello Sonata No. 1 (1978)
Cello Sonata No. 2 (1993/4)
Franz Schubert
Sonata for Arpeggione in A minor, D. 821 is often transcribed for cello.
Dmitri Shostakovich
Cello Sonata in D minor, Op. 40 (1934)
Charles Villiers Stanford
 Cello Sonata No. 1 in A major, Op. 9 (1878)
 Cello Sonata No. 2 on D minor, Op. 39 (1893)
Richard Strauss
Sonata in F major for cello and piano (1882)
 Antonio Vivaldi
 At least 9 cello sonatas
Kurt Weill
Sonata for Cello and Piano (1920)

Chronology of major cello sonatas

The following list (inevitably incomplete) tries to place the major sonatas and equivalent works for cello and piano or cello solo in chronological order of completion. It will be susceptible to uncertainty of dates, and whether original or revised versions are definitive.

See also 
 List of compositions for cello and piano
 List of solo cello pieces

References

External links
 Complete Scores of Many Cello Sonatas
 Repertoire for Solo Cello
 Some Composers of Cello Works Dates need to be double-checked against other sources as they do not always agree.

 
Articles containing video clips